Swingin' Along is a 1961 American comedy film directed by Charles Barton. The film,  which was released by 20th Century Fox, marked the final appearance of the comedy team of Tommy Noonan and Peter Marshall. The film focuses on Noonan as a courier who dreams of becoming a songwriter and Marshall as a con artist who wants to enter Noonan’s original composition in a music competition. The film co-stars Barbara Eden and features musical performances by Ray Charles, Bobby Vee and Roger Williams.

According to Peter Marshall, the film was originally planned under the title Double Trouble and the screenplay was originally written for Dean Martin and Jerry Lewis. It was later re-released with the Double Trouble title.

Plot
Freddy Merkle never finishes anything. He has a half-done painting, half a sculpture and a sonata he's been composing for quite a while. His aunt, Sophie, encourages him to finish something he starts, so he can marry his girlfriend. However Freddy, a delivery boy, can't find the inspiration.

Inside a pool room, Freddy runs into Duke, a fast-talking operator. When Freddie mentions a songwriting contest with a $2,500 first prize Duke becomes his "manager." At the coaxing of Duke and Ginny, the song is finally finished, but the sheet music blows away in the wind.

Freddy, forlorn as usual, decides to kill himself, but he can't even get that right. He's at the end of his rope when a kindly priest discovers the song, submits it to the contest and, sure enough, it becomes the winner.

Cast
 Tommy Noonan as Freddy
 Peter Marshall as Duke
 Barbara Eden as Carol
 Connie Gilchrist as Aunt Sophie
 Carol Christensen as Ginny
 Mike Mazurki as Sam, the bookie
 Ted Knight as Priest
 Ray Charles as himself
 Bobby Vee as himself
 Roger Williams as himself

See also
 List of American films of 1961

References

External links

1961 films
American comedy films
20th Century Fox films
Films directed by Charles Barton
1960s English-language films
1961 comedy films
1960s American films